
Bij Jef (formerly: Culinaire Verwennerij Bij Jef) is a restaurant in Den Hoorn, Netherlands. It is a fine dining restaurant that was awarded one Michelin star for the period 2009–present.

GaultMillau awarded the restaurant 16 out of 20 points.

Head chef of Bij Jef is Jef Schuur. The restaurant is a member of Les Patrons Cuisiniers since 2012.

See also
List of Michelin starred restaurants in the Netherlands

References 

Restaurants in the Netherlands
Michelin Guide starred restaurants in the Netherlands